Paduka Sri Sultan Abdullah Mu'adzam Shah ibni al-Marhum Sultan Ataullah Muhammad Shah II (died 22 September 1706) was the 17th Sultan of Kedah. His reign was from 1698 to 1706.

External links
 List of Sultans of Kedah

1706 deaths
17th-century Sultans of Kedah
18th-century Sultans of Kedah